Turbulence is the third studio album by Yes guitarist Steve Howe, released in 1991 through Relativity Records. It is Howe's first solo release since 1979, with his band including former Yes drummer Bill Bruford and former Ultravox keyboardist Billy Currie. The album is composed of guitar-based instrumentals, showcasing different genres that have influenced Howe. "Sensitive Chaos" contains a melody that would also be used in "I Would Have Waited Forever", the opening track to Yes' 1991 album Union. "The Inner Battle" contains a melody that would also be used in "Silent Talking" off the same Yes album.

Track listings

Personnel
Steve Howe – guitar, dobro, mandolin, koto, keyboard (track 9), percussion (tracks 5, 8), bass, hurdy-gurdy, sequencing, arrangement, sound effects, engineering (tracks 5, 6, 8), production
Billy Currie – keyboard, viola
Andrew Lucas – organ
Bill Bruford – drums (except tracks 3, 6 and 8)
Nigel Glockler – drums (tracks 3, 6)
Roger Howorth – engineering
Tim Weidner – engineering
Croyden Cooke – engineering
Renny Hill – mixing

References

External links
In Review: Steve Howe "Turbulence" at Guitar Nine Records

Steve Howe (musician) albums
1991 albums
Relativity Records albums
Albums with cover art by Roger Dean (artist)